Stars/Time/Bubbles/Love is the fourth album from The Free Design. It was released in spring 1970. In 2004, it was named "The Free Design's best album to date" by Dominique Leone on Pitchfork.

Track listing
All songs are by Chris Dedrick except where otherwise noted.

 "Bubbles"
 "Tomorrow Is the First Day of the Rest of My Life" (C. C. Courtney)
 "Kije's Ouija"
 "Butterflies Are Free" (Stephen Schwartz)
 "Stay Off Your Frown"
 "Starlight"
 "Time and Love" (Laura Nyro)
 "I'm a Yogi"
 "Raindrops Keep Fallin' on My Head" (Bacharach/David)
 "Howdjadoo" (Carole Bayer Sager/George Fischoff)
 "That's All People"

References

The Free Design albums
1970 albums